Harry Källström (30 June 1939 – 13 July 2009), nicknamed "Sputnik" , was a Swedish professional rally driver who debuted in 1957 and competed in the World Rally Championship in the 1970s. Prior to the forming of the WRC, Källström won the RAC Rally in a Lancia Fulvia 1.6 Coupé HF in 1969 and 1970. In 1969, he also captured the European Rally Championship title.

Partnered with Claes-Göran Andersson, and driving a Datsun 160J, he took his only World Rally Championship victory at the 1976 Acropolis Rally Greece. At the same rally and in the same car, he finished third in 1977 and 1979.

His fourth podium appearance in the world championship was a second place at the 1973 Safari Rally in a Datsun 1800 SSS. This was the first WRC event to end in a dead heat; he and Shekhar Mehta ended on the same penalty points (6 hours and 46 minutes) but Mehta was awarded the win due to being the fastest in the opening stages. At the 1985 Rallye Côte d'Ivoire, Toyota teammates Juha Kankkunen and Björn Waldegård repeated this feat.

Complete IMC results

References

External links
Harry Källström at RallyBase
Harry Källström at ewrc-results

Swedish rally drivers
World Rally Championship drivers
European Rally Championship drivers
1939 births
2009 deaths
People from Södertälje
Sportspeople from Stockholm County